Giuseppe Cavicchi (31 May 1920) was an Italian football manager and player. Cavicchi greatest achievement was winning the 1969 European Competition for Women's Football.

Honours

Italy
1969 European Competition for Women's Football

References

1920 births
Serie D players
Italian football managers
Association football forwards
Italy women's national football team managers